Route 358 is a provincial highway located in the Capitale-Nationale region of Quebec. It runs from the junction of Route 138 (south of Autoroute 40) in Cap-Santé (west of Donnacona) and ends in the Vanier sector of Quebec City also at the junction of Highway 138 (known as Boulevard Wilfrid-Hamel). The roadway passes north of the Jean-Lesage International Airport situated just west of the junctions of Autoroute 40, 73 and 573. West of the Airport it overlaps Route 367 as well as Route 365 in Pont-Rouge.

Towns located along Route 358

 Cap-Santé
 Pont-Rouge
 Sainte-Catherine-de-la-Jacques-Cartier
 Saint-Augustin
 Quebec City (including L'Ancienne-Lorette and Vanier)

See also
 List of Quebec provincial highways

References

External links 
 Official Transports Quebec Map 
 Route 358 on OpenStreetMap
 Route 358 on Google Maps

358
Roads in Capitale-Nationale
Streets in Quebec City